The chasquis (also ) were the messengers of the Inca empire. Not only were they used to transport oral messages, but they also helped the inspector general, the Sapa Inka's brother, keep track of the people in the empire.  were chosen from the fittest young males and were known to be the fastest runners.

Operation 
 were dispatched along thousands of kilometres, taking advantage of the vast Inca system of purpose-built roads and rope bridges in the Andes of Peru and Ecuador. On the coast of what is now Peru, their route ran from Nazca to Tumbes.  routes also extended into further reaches of the empire into parts of what are now Colombia, Bolivia, Argentina, and Chile.

Chasquis would start at one  and run to the next , where a rested  was waiting to carry the message to the next .

Consignment 

The  was a conch shell used as a trumpet, used to signal to other  that one runner was close, so that they could prepare to run.

Modern day 
Several paths and preserved  used by  still exist today. There are trails that allow one to travel along these paths and to experience the distance and terrain that the  traveled. Most of these paths were used by the Inca, but some sections assumed to be of Incan origin are unconfirmed or now disproved. Many modern-day races run on these paths.

Most of the paths contain Inca rope bridges, which were skillfully constructed by Inca people by using strands of vegetation that were woven together and reinforced by wood and stones. They were frequently used by  runners delivering messages throughout the Inca Empire. Many of these bridges are still intact and can be walked across without fear of them breaking because of how durable they are.

See also
 Chasqui I
 Tambo (Incan structure)
 Inca road system

References 

Inca society
Postal systems
Obsolete occupations